Ben Fordham (born 29 November 1976) is an Australian journalist, sports reporter and radio presenter. Fordham currently hosts Ben Fordham Live on Sydney radio station 2GB.

Career
Fordham began his career on Sydney's 2UE radio station, for which he won a Walkley Award for his coverage of the 1997 Thredbo landslide. In 1998, Fordham moved to television and joined Sky News Australia as a reporter and presenter.

After less than a year at Sky News, Fordham joined the Nine Network, working on tabloid current affair and news programs including 60 Minutes, A Current Affair, Nine News and Today.

Fordham filled in for Stuart Bocking on 2UE Nights in the 2008/09 summer period and also filled in for Ray Hadley on 2GB in the 2009/10 summer period.

In 2010, he joined Nine News and Today as a reporter, he also covered the 2010 federal election. In January 2011, Fordham became the Today sports presenter replacing Cameron Williams. He also joined 2GB in January 2011, replacing Jason Morrison on the programme Sydney Live (since renamed Ben Fordham Live).

In March 2014, Fordham announced that he would be leaving Today at the end of the year to concentrate on his radio career. Since moving into his radio position, he has served as a fill-in presenter on Today and Nine News. In 2016, Fordham was announced as co-host of Australian Ninja Warrior alongside Rebecca Maddern on the Nine Network.

In 2018, Fordham was also made an inaugural board member of the Ash Williams Show Podcast, alongside other media personalities such as Ed Kavalee, Sonia Kruger and Tony Martin. Fordham was also instrumental in securing the support of Scott Pape as a permanent board member. In May 2020, 2GB announced that Fordham would replace Alan Jones, who was retiring from radio. Fordham finished hosting his drive show on 22 May 2020 and began his new role on 1 June 2020. His breakfast show took the same name as his drive show: Ben Fordham Live.

In October 2021, Fordham announced that he will not return as co-host of Australian Ninja Warrior.

Personal life
When Fordham was seven years of age, he was diagnosed with epilepsy after suffering a seizure. He did work experience at a radio station as a teenager while a student at Saint Ignatius' College, Riverview, a Catholic college in Lane Cove. He is managed by the Fordham Company, which was run by his late father, John.

In October 2011, Fordham married Seven News presenter Jodie Speers. In August 2014, Fordham announced on Today that his wife was pregnant with their first child; their son was born later that year.

In April 2016, Fordham announced on radio that Speers was pregnant with their second child. She gave birth to a daughter later that year.

In September 2019, Fordham announced that Speers gave birth to their third child.

Legal issues
On 26 February 2009, Fordham was charged with concealing a serious crime and breaching the Listening Devices Act. The Nine Network and A Current Affair producer Andrew Byrne were also charged.

On 20 July 2010, NSW Supreme Court judge Elizabeth Fullerton called Fordham's attitude "disrespectful" when he failed to appear in court to hear her judgement on the charges of breaching the Listening Devices Act. Justice Fullerton found him guilty of one of four charges against him, that he knowingly recorded a conversation on 28 May 2008. Byrne was convicted of four charges of breaching the act.

The conversation was aired on ACA in May 2008, claiming to show former Waverley mayor James Markham ordering a fatal hit on a male escort. Although found guilty, Fordham and Byrne each escaped conviction, with Justice Fullerton saying it was "an appalling lack of judgment by two senior journalists who are otherwise held in esteem by their colleagues".

References

External links
 Ben Fordham
 Ben Fordham, The Fordham Company

1976 births
Living people
Nine News presenters
Australian radio presenters
Australian game show hosts
People educated at St Pius X College, Sydney
People educated at Saint Ignatius' College, Riverview
2GB presenters